Ngoko is a district in the Cuvette Department of Republic of the Congo.

References 

Cuvette Department
Districts of the Republic of the Congo